Pegwell Bay, Kent – a Recollection of October 5th 1858 is an oil-on-canvas painting by British artist William Dyce, depicting the landscape at Pegwell Bay, on the east coast of Kent.  Considered a Pre-Raphaelite work, Dyce employs a mode of heightened realism and intricate detail to create a powerful landscape.  It is considered to be Dyce's best painting, and is held by the Tate Gallery.

Background
Dyce was born in Aberdeen, where his father was a doctor.  An Anglo-Catholic, he had previously painted mainly portraits, religious paintings, and some murals in the rebuilt Houses of Parliament.  Dyce was elected an Associate of the Royal Academy in 1844 and a full member of the Royal Academy of Arts in 1848.

Painting
The painting was inspired by a visit by the Dyce family to Pegwell Bay in August 1857.  Pegwell Bay is a shallow inlet on the coast of Kent between Ramsgate and Sandwich, at the estuary of the River Stour, Kent.  It was a popular Victorian holiday destination, with tea gardens and donkey rides.  The bay was also a popular place for fossil hunters.

In the painting, the tide has gone out, revealing a flat expanse of sand, pools of water, rocks, and algae.  Standing separately the foreground are Dyce's son with a spade looking out to sea, his wife, and her two sisters, collecting shells and fossils on the beach.  The women are wrapped in shawls against the cool of the autumn evening.  Smaller figures are hunting in rockpools in the background, with taking a ride on a donkey.  A male figure to the right, carrying artist's materials and looking up at the cliff, may be a self-portrait of Dyce himself.  The setting sun gives the cliffs and beach a pink glow, but the scene remains bleak.  Dyce was a keen geologist, and the strata of the cliffs behind the beach are carefully delineated.  A white streak in the sky is Donati's Comet.

Dyce made initial studies on the beach, en plein air.  A small watercolour study made in 1857 was acquired by Aberdeen Art Gallery in 1991, funded in part by the Art Fund.  The completed oil painting depicts a later time in the evening than the study; Dyce also adds his family in the foreground of the final painting, and moves the date one year to include the comet.  The beach was frequented by Charles Darwin and his family, and On the Origin of Species was published in 1859, while Dyce was working on the painting.

The painting can be seen as an allegory of time and space, geology and astronomy, family and history, with science meeting Christianity on the beach: Pegwell Bay was reputedly the place where St Augustine landed in 597, on his mission to bring Christianity to the British Isles (and also where Hengist and Horsa arrived in the 5th century).  The comet may be an echo of the Star of Bethlehem from the biblical nativity story, but could also be a reference to the science of astronomy and the place of humans in the universe.

It was exhibited at the Royal Academy summer exhibition in 1860. It was so detailed that Dyce was accused of working from a photograph. It was purchased by the Tate Gallery in 1894, where it remains.

See also
 William Powell Frith's 1854 seaside painting, Ramsgate Sands

External links

References
 William Dyce, Pegwell Bay, Kent – a Recollection of October 5th 1858, Tate Gallery
 Work of the Week: Pegwell Bay, Kent – a Recollection of October 5th 1858, by William Dyce, Tate Gallery
 Pegwell Bay by William Dyce, 1857, Art Fund
 Geology in the Pre-Raphaelite landscape: William Dyce’s Pegwell Bay, Alexis Drahos and Christine Thompson
 googleartproject.com
 Victorian Landscape Watercolors, Scott Wilcox, Christopher Newall, Yale Center for British Art, Cleveland Museum of Art, Birmingham Museums and Art Gallery,  p. 97
 Literature And Science: Social Impact And Interaction, John H. Cartwright, Brian Baker, p. 175-6
 Water, Leisure and Culture: European Historical Perspectives, edited by Susan C. Anderson, Bruce Tabb, p. 99–100
 "Fire in the Sky: Comets and Meteors, the Decisive Centuries", in British Art and Science, Roberta J. M. Olson, Jay M. Pasachoff p. 237–244
 Reading the Pre-Raphaelites, T. J. Barringer, p. 79–82
 A Popular Handbook to the Tate Gallery, 'National Gallery of British Art', Edward Tyas Cook, p. 103-4
 Charles Darwin And Victorian Visual Culture, Jonathan Smith, p. 75-7

1860 paintings
Paintings by William Dyce
Collection of the Tate galleries
Water in art
Horses in art
Kent in art